The 1969 New Jersey gubernatorial election was held on November 4, 1969. Republican nominee William T. Cahill defeated Democratic nominee Robert B. Meyner with 59.66% of the vote. This was the only gubernatorial election that Republicans won between 1953 and 1977. 

Primary elections were held on June 3. Cahill won the Republican nomination narrowly over fellow South Jersey Congressman Charles W. Sandman Jr., while Meyner finished with nearly twice the vote of his closest competitor.

Democratic primary

Candidates
Henry Helstoski, U.S. Representative from East Rutherford
John L. Hennessey, Sea Bright tavern owner
William F. Kelly, State Senator from Hudson County
Robert B. Meyner, former Governor
Ned J. Parsekian, former State Senator from Bergen County
D. Louis Tonti, director of the New Jersey Highway Authority

Results

Republican primary

Candidates
William T. Cahill, U.S. Representative from Camden County
Frank X. McDermott, State Senator from Union County
William E. Ozzard, former State Senator from Somerset County
Charles W. Sandman Jr., U.S. Representative from Cape May County
Harry L. Sears, former State Senator from Morris County

Results

General election

Candidates
William T. Cahill (Republican)
Robert B. Meyner (Democratic)
James E. Johnson (Independent)
Jack D. Alvino (Independent)
Winifred O. Perry (Conservative)
Louis Vanderplate (Independent)
Jules Levin (Socialist Labor)

Results

References

1969
New Jersey
Gubernatorial
November 1969 events in the United States